Transfiguration Cathedral is Russian Orthodox church located inside the earthen rampart of the Belozersk' Kremlin in Vologda region. It is a three-apse four-pillar temple with five onion-like domes,  and is the dominant building of Kremlin.
 
Its construction had started in 1668 and was fully completed only by the end of the 1670s.  The architecture of the temple was designed in archaic forms as it was typical for the second half of the XVII-th century. However, the  facades' decoration was developed in the style typical for more early period – those of local architecture of the XVI-th century. Currently the Transfiguration Cathedral functions as a museum  and is managed by the Belozersky Local Museum. The museum is open to the public from May to October. 

An object of cultural heritage of Russia of federal significance.

References

External links 

 Dimensional drawings, photographs of fragments.  Historical photographs. The state of temple for the period 2010–2011. Building view after the building view  of 2012. Dimensional plans (in Russian).
 Design proposals Facades of the temple. Coloring options (in Russian).
 Transfiguration Cathedral (in Russian) // web site  ""Соборы.ру"" ("Cathedrals.ru")
 Transfiguration Cathedral (Belozersk) (in Russian) // web site Russian temples
 Transfiguration Cathedral (Belozersk) -  Belozersk Local Museum's official site (in Russian) 
 spherical panoramas on the site Kremlin of Belozersk (in Russian)

Transfiguration
History museums in Russia
Religious museums in Russia
Churches completed in 1667
17th-century Eastern Orthodox church buildings
Tourist attractions in Vologda Oblast
Cultural heritage monuments of federal significance in Vologda Oblast